Triomf is a 2008 film based on the 1994 novel by Marlene van Niekerk.

Synopsis 
On the eve of elections in the newly democratic South Africa, the whole country is restless. In the poor white neighbourhood of Triomf, built on the ruins of the legendary Sophiatown, the Benade family is part of that white marginalized class, rarely shown in South African cinema. Father, mother, the son with learning disabilities and uncle Treppie share a decaying house surrounded by promiscuity. Worried about the result of the elections, they plan to escape to the North.

Awards 
 Durban International Film Festival 2008 (Sudáfrica) "Best South African Film".
 TARIFA, Spain - Lionel Newton "Best Actor".

External links
 www.triomfmovie.com
 

2008 films
French drama films
Films with screenplays by Malcolm Kohll
South African drama films
2000s French films